The 2006 United States Senate election in Michigan was held November 7, 2006. Incumbent Democratic U.S. Senator Debbie Stabenow won re-election to a second term.

Candidates

Democratic 
 Debbie Stabenow, incumbent U.S. Senator

Republican 
 Mike Bouchard, Oakland County Sheriff

Libertarian 
 Leonard Schwartz, attorney and economist

Green 
 David Sole, President of UAW Local 2334

U.S. Taxpayers 
 Dennis FitzSimons, retiree

Campaign 
Economic issues took front and center in the campaign, as Michigan's unemployment rate was one of the highest in the nation.  In July 2006, unemployment in Michigan stood at approximately 7%, compared with a 4.7% rate nationwide. Pessimism about the state's economic future had left Michigan ranked 49th nationally between 2000 and 2005 in retaining young adults.  Since its peak, Detroit had lost over a million people.  Bouchard claimed that the incumbent had accomplished nothing, dubbing her "Do-Nothing Debbie." President George W. Bush came to Michigan and raised $1 million for Bouchard.

Debates 
Complete video of debate, October 15, 2006
Complete video of debate, October 18, 2006

Predictions

Polling

Results 
From a long way out Stabenow looked like she might be vulnerable. President Bush even came to Michigan to campaign for Bouchard, raising over $1,000,000 dollars for him. However Bouchard never won a single poll. By October the Republican Party, started taking resources out of Michigan to focus on closer races, essentially ceding the race to Stabenow. Stabenow would go on to win the election easily, capturing nearly 57% of the vote. Stabenow did well throughout Michigan, but performed better in heavily populated cities like Detroit, Lansing, Ann Arbor, and Kalamazoo. Bouchard did win Grand Rapids, a typical Republican area. He also won in many rural areas around the state. However Bouchard failed to put a dent in Stabenow's lead, largely due to her strong performance in heavily populated areas. Bouchard conceded to Stabenow at 9:58 P.M. EST.
The following results are official.

See also 
 2006 United States Senate elections

References

External links 
 Stabenow for Senate 
 Bouchard for Senate
 Schwartz for Senate
 Sole for Senate
 FitzSimons for Senate

Michigan
2006
2006 Michigan elections